The mountain masked apalis (Apalis personata), also known as the black-faced apalis, is a species of bird in the family Cisticolidae.  It is native to the Albertine Rift montane forests.  It was first described in 1902.

References

mountain masked apalis
Birds of Central Africa
mountain masked apalis
Taxonomy articles created by Polbot